Michelle Edwards may refer to:

 Michelle Edwards (basketball) (born 1966), American retired basketball player
 Michelle Edwards (hurdler) (born 1969), British hurdler
 Michelle Claire Edwards (born 1974), badminton player from South Africa
 Michele Roosevelt Edwards, American businesswoman